Jeevitha Chakram is a 1971 Indian Telugu-language drama film directed by C. S. Rao. It stars N. T. Rama Rao, Vanisri and Sarada, with music composed by Shankar–Jaikishan. It is produced by P. Gangadhar Rao under the Nava Sakthi Productions banner.

Plot
Suseela (Vanisri) is a middle-class working woman and her father (Ramana Reddy) and brother (Padmanabham) are quite lazy and without any responsibility. Her mother is bedridden and to look after the family, Suseela becomes a working lady. Cut from there to a village backdrop where an affluent couple (Perumal, Hemalatha) has a beautiful daughter named Kamala (Sarada). She is head over heels in love with her uncle's son Raja (Sr. NTR) who studies abroad.  Raja's father (Nagayya) is a rich man who plans to give all the business responsibilities to his son as soon as the latter returns home. Kamala's parents also plan to get their daughter married to Raja the moment he is back. At this juncture, Raja returns to India and he meets Suseela in dramatic circumstances. He starts feeling sorry for her when he hears about her family troubles. This sympathy slowly turns to love. At this crucial moment Kamala, who loves Raja with all her heart gets bedridden due to illness. Raja reaches the village when Kamala is almost in fatal condition and realizes her love for him. He marries her with the good intention of giving her happiness by fulfilling her last wish. But things turn different after the marriage. Kamala miraculously recovers from her illness and she becomes mentally as well as physically fit. Raja gets stuck in between his Kamala and his love Suseela because of this shocking change. He gets very upset and finds it tough to be affectionate toward his wife and at the same time worries about his love for Susheela. Kamala and Suseela come to know about this fact and decide to sacrifice their respective love. But Suseela being a balanced woman decides to go away and live single by understanding the greatness of the relationship between Kamala and Raja.

Cast
N. T. Rama Rao as Raja
Vanisri as Suseela
Sharada as Kamala
V. Nagayya  as Dharma Rao
Jaggayya as Shankar
Relangi as Buchi Babu
Ramana Reddy as 'Gunshot' Ramayya
Padmanabham as Pichi Babu
Prabhakar Reddy as Bhujangam
Raavi Kondala Rao as Manager Achyutaramayya
Perumallu
Chalapathi Rao as Prabhakaram
Sriranjani Jr. as Santhamma
Hemalatha 
Surabhi Balasaraswathi as Kamini

Soundtrack

Music composed by Shankar Jaikishan.

References

External links 
 

1971 films
Films scored by Shankar–Jaikishan
1970s Telugu-language films
Indian drama films
1971 drama films
Films directed by C. S. Rao